William Ferdinand "Wild Bill" Luhrsen (April 14, 1884 – August 15, 1973) was a pitcher in Major League Baseball. He played for the Pittsburgh Pirates in 1913.

References

External links

 William Ferdinand "Wild Bill" Luhrsen on Find a Grave

1884 births
1973 deaths
Major League Baseball pitchers
Pittsburgh Pirates players
Baseball players from Illinois
Minor league baseball managers
Pine Bluff Pine Knotts players
Argenta Shamrocks players
Poplar Bluff (minor league baseball) players
Brinkley (minor league baseball) players
Great Bend Millers players
El Reno Packers players
Superior Brickmakers players
Selma Centralites players
Albany Babies players
Albany Senators players
Omaha Rourkes players
Sioux City Indians players
Little Rock Travelers players
Sherman Hitters players
People from Buckley, Illinois
Marianna Brickeys players